Shiroi Ringu he, full title , is a professional wrestling video game for the Super Famicom that was released on December 27, 1995. Popular female Japanese professional wrestlers like Shinobu Kandori and Noriyo Tateno appear in this game.

Gameplay
In the "story" mode of the game, players control a young woman as she prepares for each match of women's professional wrestling. One of the federations involved in the game is the Ladies Legend Pro-Wrestling circuit. Players essentially improve their skill parameters by training on week at a time. As they progress through their careers, players can either become "babyfaces" (good guys) or "heels" (bad guys). Text boxes allow players to read about the athlete that they are conditioning to fight. There are story elements that allow players to experience a run for the championship.

Using the "play" mode of this game simply allows the wrestlers to face off against each other; with no consequences in the story. Passwords are used to convert the data of a "story" mode character into the "play" mode of the game.

Players can either do a single match (consisting of two opposing wrestlers) or a tag team match (consisting of teams of two wrestlers).

See also

List of licensed wrestling video games

References

1995 video games
Japan-exclusive video games
Pony Canyon games
Professional wrestling games
Raising sims
Super Nintendo Entertainment System games
Super Nintendo Entertainment System-only games
Multiplayer and single-player video games
Video games developed in Japan